In Greek mythology, Iasion  or Iasus , also called Eetion , was the founder of the mystic rites on the island of Samothrace.

Family 
According to the mythographer Apollodorus, Iasion is the son of the Pleiad Electra and Zeus, and the brother of Dardanus and possibly Emathion. Both Hellanicus and Diodorus Siculus repeat this parentage, adding Harmonia as his sister. According to an Italian version of the genealogy, Iasion and Dardanus are both Electra's sons, and are both born in Italy, with Iasion fathered by Corythus and Dardanus by Zeus. In Hyginus' Fabulae, Iasion is called the son of Ilithyius.

With Demeter, Iasion was the father of Plutus, the god of wealth. According to Hyginus' De Astronomica, Iasion was also the father of Philomelus, while, according to Diodorus Siculus, he was the father of a son named Corybas with Cybele.

Mythology 
At the marriage of Cadmus and Harmonia, Iasion was lured by Demeter away from the other revelers. They had intercourse as Demeter lay on her back in a freshly plowed furrow. When they rejoined the celebration, Zeus guessed what had happened because of the mud on Demeter's backside, and out of envy killed Iasion with a thunderbolt. In one account, his death was caused by his impiety to the statue of Demeter instead. Servius, in his commentary upon Virgil's Aeneid, states that Iasion was killed by his brother Dardanus, whereas Hyginus attributes his death to horses. Ovid, in contrast, says that Iasion lived to an old age as the husband of Demeter.

Some versions of this myth conclude with Iasion and the agricultural hero Triptolemus then becoming the Gemini constellation.

Notes

References 

 Apollodorus, Apollodorus. The Library, Volume I: Books 1-3.9, translated by James G. Frazer, Loeb Classical Library No. 121, Cambridge, Massachusetts, Harvard University Press, 1921. . Online version at Harvard University Press. Online version at the Perseus Digital Library.
 Fowler, R. L. (2000), Early Greek Mythography: Volume 1: Text and Introduction, Oxford University Press, 2000. . Google Books.
 Fowler, R. L. (2013), Early Greek Mythography: Volume 2: Commentary, Oxford University Press, 2013. . Google Books.
 Gantz, Timothy, Early Greek Myth: A Guide to Literary and Artistic Sources, Johns Hopkins University Press, 1996, Two volumes:  (Vol. 1),  (Vol. 2).
 Grenfell, Bernard P., and Arthur S. Hunt, The Oxyrhynchus Papyri, Part XI, London, Egypt Exploration Fund, 1915. Internet Archive.
 Grimal, Pierre, The Dictionary of Classical Mythology, Wiley-Blackwell, 1996. . Internet Archive.
 Hansen, William, Handbook of Classical Mythology, ABC-Clio, 2004. . Internet Archive.
 Hard, Robin, The Routledge Handbook of Greek Mythology: Based on H.J. Rose's "Handbook of Greek Mythology", Psychology Press, 2004. . Google Books.
 Hesiod, Catalogue of Women, in Hesiod: The Shield, Catalogue of Women, Other Fragments, edited and translated by Glenn W. Most, Loeb Classical Library No. 503, Cambridge, Massachusetts, Harvard University Press, 2007, 2018. . Online version at Harvard University Press.
 Hesiod, Theogony from The Homeric Hymns and Homerica with an English Translation by Hugh G. Evelyn-White, Cambridge, MA.,Harvard University Press; London, William Heinemann Ltd. 1914. Online version at the Perseus Digital Library. Greek text available from the same website.
 Homer, The Odyssey with an English Translation by A.T. Murray, PH.D. in two volumes. Cambridge, MA., Harvard University Press; London, William Heinemann, Ltd. 1919. . Online version at the Perseus Digital Library. Greek text available from the same website.
 Hyginus, Gaius Julius, Fabulae, in The Myths of Hyginus, edited and translated by Mary A. Grant, Lawrence: University of Kansas Press, 1960. Online version at ToposText.
 Lactantius, Divine Institutes, Translated by William Fletcher (1810-1900). From Ante-Nicene Fathers, Vol. 7. Edited by Alexander Roberts, James Donaldson, and A. Cleveland Coxe. (Buffalo, NY: Christian Literature Publishing Co., 1886.) Online version at the Topos Text Project.
 Maurus Servius Honoratus, In Vergilii carmina comentarii. Servii Grammatici qui feruntur in Vergilii carmina commentarii; recensuerunt Georgius Thilo et Hermannus Hagen. Georgius Thilo. Leipzig. B. G. Teubner. 1881. Online version at the Perseus Digital Library.
 Merkelbach, R., and M. L. West, Fragmenta Hesiodea, Clarendon Press Oxford, 1967. .
 Ovid, Metamorphoses, edited and translated by Brookes More, Boston, Cornhill Publishing Co., 1922. Online version at the Perseus Digital Library. Online version at ToposText.
 Smith, William, Dictionary of Greek and Roman Biography and Mythology, London (1873). Online version at the Perseus Digital Library.
 Wendel, Carl, Scholia in Apollonium Rhodium vetera, Hildesheim, Weidmann, 1999. .

Kings in Greek mythology
Consorts of Demeter
Children of Zeus
Demigods in classical mythology

Deeds of Zeus